Anapta is a genus of sea cucumbers in the family Synaptidae.

Species
The following species are recognised in the genus Anapta:

Anapta fallax  Lampert, 1889
Anapta gracilis  Semper, 1867
Anapta subtilis  Sluiter, 1887

References

Holothuroidea genera
Synaptidae